Bradley Douglas Falchuk (born March 1, 1971) is an American television writer, director, and producer. He is best known for co-creating with Ryan Murphy the television series Glee, American Horror Story, Scream Queens, and Pose. He was also a writer and executive producer for Nip/Tuck and is married to actress Gwyneth Paltrow.

Early life
Falchuk was born in Massachusetts to Jewish parents. His mother is Nancy Falchuk, the national president of the Hadassah Women's Zionist Organization of America from 2007 to 2011. In high school, he tried to stand out from his classmates by wearing a tie to school each day. He also played baseball, basketball and lacrosse. He said, "I was always trying to look smart because I didn't feel smart"; he actually had undiagnosed dyslexia.  He graduated from Hobart and William Smith Colleges in 1993.

He received his master's in screenwriting from AFI Conservatory.

Career

Beginnings and Glee
Falchuk's career in television began as a writer for Mutant X (2001), Earth: Final Conflict (2001–02) and Veritas: The Quest (2003), before he was hired to work on the first season of Nip/Tuck in 2003. While working on Nip/Tuck, he formed a close bond and partnership with the show's creator, Ryan Murphy. Falchuk and Murphy went on to write a television pilot titled Pretty/Handsome, about a transgender gynecologist, which the FX network bought in 2008. However, the pilot was not picked up as a series.

As Nip/Tuck neared its sixth and final season, Falchuk and Murphy began to look for their next project, and decided to focus on a lighter subject. They teamed up with Ian Brennan, who had written a screenplay about high school show choirs, to pitch a one-hour comedy about a glee club to the Fox Broadcasting Company. Their pitch was successful and turned into the television show Glee, which premiered in 2009. Falchuk, Murphy and Brennan received two Writers Guild of America Award nominations for Best Comedy Series and Best New Series.

After the early success of Glee, Falchuk signed a two-year, seven-figure deal with 20th Century Fox Television which involved further work on Glee as well as the development of other projects for the studio. Glee concluded following its sixth season, which aired from January 9 to March 20, 2015.

Anthology series and Scream Queens
In 2011, Falchuk co-created the FX horror-drama anthology series American Horror Story with previous collaborator Ryan Murphy. The first season, starring Jessica Lange, Connie Britton and Dylan McDermott, premiered October 5, 2011, and received critical acclaim; the series was nominated for 17 Primetime Emmy Awards in 2012, and 15 Primetime Emmys in 2013, with Falchuk nominated for Outstanding Miniseries or Movie both years. In 2014, the show was once again nominated for 17 Primetime Emmy Awards, with Falchuk nominated for Outstanding Writing for a Miniseries, Movie or a Dramatic Special.

Falchuk is an executive producer on American Crime Story with Ryan Murphy, which began airing on February 2, 2016. Falchuk, Murphy and Brennan also created Fox's horror comedy series Scream Queens, which ran from September 2015 to December 2016, and starred Emma Roberts, Lea Michele, Abigail Breslin, Keke Palmer and Jamie Lee Curtis. The first season was set on a college campus.

In March 2019, Falchuk signed a four-year overall deal with Netflix through his Brad Falchuk Teley-Vision production company to "develop, write, produce, and direct new series".

Personal life
In 1997, as a student at the American Film Institute, Falchuk co-founded the arts education nonprofit Young Storytellers, with Mikkel Bondesen and Andrew Barrett in response to cutbacks in funding for creative arts programs in Los Angeles Unified School District. Falchuk currently serves on the Young Storytellers advisory board of directors.

Falchuk's brother, Evan Falchuk, founded the United Independent Party and was a candidate for governor in the 2014 Massachusetts gubernatorial election. In 2008, Falchuk was diagnosed by his father and brother's medical consulting firm as having a serious problem with his spinal cord. After undergoing emergency spinal surgery, he made a full recovery, and his experience inspired parts of the Glee episode "Wheels".

Falchuk's first wife was television producer Suzanne Bukinik, whom he began dating in 1994. The couple were married in 2002 and had two children. They filed for divorce in 2013.

Falchuk began dating actress Gwyneth Paltrow in 2014, whom he had met on the set of Glee in 2010. The couple went public with their relationship in April 2015 at a birthday party after months of speculation. On January 8, 2018, Paltrow and Falchuk announced they had become engaged. Their wedding was held on September 29, 2018, in The Hamptons on Long Island.

Falchuk and Paltrow practice Transcendental Meditation together.

Credits

Writer/producer
 Mutant X (2001)
 Earth: Final Conflict (2001–2002)
 Nip/Tuck (2004–2010)
 Glee (2009–2015)
 American Horror Story (2011–present)
 Scream Queens (2015–2016)
 American Crime Story (2017–present)
 9-1-1 (2018–present)
 Pose (2018–2021)
 The Politician (2019–2020)
 9-1-1: Lone Star (2020–present)
 American Horror Stories (2021–present)
 The Brothers Sun (2023)

Awards and nominations

References

External links
 

1971 births
Living people
American male screenwriters
Jewish American screenwriters
AFI Conservatory alumni
American television writers
American television directors
Television producers from Massachusetts
Writers from Newton, Massachusetts
American male television writers
Place of birth missing (living people)
Screenwriters from Massachusetts
Paltrow family
21st-century American Jews